Viktor Havlicek (16 July 1914 - 22 October 1971) was an Austrian footballer and football manager. He played for First Vienna FC, Phönix Karlsruhe and, as a wartime guest player, Kickers Offenbach and gained 3 caps for Austria. His brother was Eduard "Edy" Havlicek.

He spent the majority of his coaching career in Germany and the Netherlands with Alemannia Aachen, MVV, Roda JC.

From 1958 to 1960, he coached Belgium, Constant Vanden Stock being the manager.

References

1914 births
1971 deaths
Austrian footballers
Austria international footballers
Expatriate footballers in Germany
Expatriate football managers in Belgium
Expatriate football managers in the Netherlands
Karlsruher SC players
Kickers Offenbach players
Austrian football managers
Alemannia Aachen managers
Royal Antwerp F.C. managers
MVV Maastricht managers
Roda JC Kerkrade managers
Austrian expatriate football managers
Austrian expatriate sportspeople in the Netherlands
Austrian expatriate sportspeople in Belgium
Austrian expatriate sportspeople in Germany
Association football goalkeepers
Austrian people of Slavic descent